Pitumpe South Grama Niladhari Division is a Grama Niladhari Division of the Padukka Divisional Secretariat  of Colombo District  of Western Province, Sri Lanka .  It has Grama Niladhari Division Code 453B.

Pitumpe South is a surrounded by the Arukwatta North, Pitumpe North, Angampitiya and Galagedara East  Grama Niladhari Divisions.

Demographics

Ethnicity 

The Pitumpe South Grama Niladhari Division has a Sinhalese majority (97.6%) . In comparison, the Padukka Divisional Secretariat (which contains the Pitumpe South Grama Niladhari Division) has a Sinhalese majority (95.8%)

Religion 

The Pitumpe South Grama Niladhari Division has a Buddhist majority (96.4%) . In comparison, the Padukka Divisional Secretariat (which contains the Pitumpe South Grama Niladhari Division) has a Buddhist majority (94.6%)

Grama Niladhari Divisions of Padukka Divisional Secretariat

References